Panagiotis Chronis (born 18 July 1984) is a Greek football player.

Chronis was previously on the books of Ethnikos Asteras F.C. during the 2002–03 Beta Ethniki season.

References

1984 births
Living people
Greek footballers
Association football midfielders
Aiolikos F.C. players
Ethnikos Asteras F.C. players
People from Mytilene
Sportspeople from the North Aegean